Jungle Stampede is a 1950 American adventure film directed by George Breakston and written by Ronald Davidson. The film stars George Breakston, Yorke Coplen, Ronald Davidson, Herman Schopp, Stan Lawrence-Brown and Miguel Roginsky. The film was released on July 28, 1950, by Republic Pictures. It was condemned by the National Legion of Decency.

Plot

Cast 

 George Breakston as George Breakston
 Yorke Coplen as Yorke Coplen
 Ronald Davidson as Commentator
 Herman Schopp as Safari Cameraman
 Stan Lawrence-Brown as Safari Member
 Miguel Roginsky as Safari Member

References

External links 

 

1950 films
American adventure films
1950 adventure films
Republic Pictures films
Films directed by George Breakston
Films produced by George Breakston
American black-and-white films
1950s English-language films
1950s American films